John 9 is the ninth chapter of the Gospel of John in the New Testament of the Christian Bible. It maintains the previous chapter's theme "Jesus is light", recording the healing of a man who had been blind from birth, a miracle performed by Jesus, and their subsequent dealings with the Pharisees.  The man born blind comes to complete faith
in Jesus, while some of the Pharisees remain in their sin. The author of the book containing this chapter is anonymous, but early Christian tradition uniformly affirmed that John composed this Gospel.

Text 
The original text was written in Koine Greek. This chapter is divided into 41 verses.

Textual witnesses
Some early manuscripts containing the text of this chapter are: 
Papyrus 75 (AD 175–225)
Papyrus 66 (c. 200).
Codex Vaticanus (325-350)
Codex Sinaiticus (330-360)
Codex Bezae (c. 400)
Codex Alexandrinus (400-440)
Codex Ephraemi Rescriptus (c. 450; extant verses 1–10)
Papyrus 128 (6th/7th century; extant verses 3–4)

Sub-divisions
The New King James Version organises this chapter as follows:
  = A Man Born Blind Receives Sight
  = The Pharisees Excommunicate the Healed Man
  = True Vision and True Blindness

Location
Jesus and His disciples are said to be "passing by" and there is no indication yet that they have left Jerusalem, the scene of the narrative in chapters 7 and 8. Jesus sends the man He heals to the Pool of Siloam, a rock-cut pool on the southern slope of Jerusalem, located outside the walls of the Old City to the southeast. However, there are also references to a Jewish ruling that anyone who believed Jesus to be the Messiah would be excluded from the synagogue (John 9:22). There is no other New Testament reference to Jerusalem having a synagogue, but rabbinical tradition states that there were 480 synagogues in Jerusalem at the time of the Jewish rebellion.

Chronology
The initial events of this chapter occur on a Sabbath, not necessarily connected with the Feast of Tabernacles or the days immediately afterwards when the events of John 7-8 took place. H. W. Watkins suggests that this was the last day, the "great day" of the Feast of Tabernacles referred to in  because "nothing has taken place which makes it necessary to suppose any interval, and though the discourses seem long, they would have occupied but a short time in delivery", and the Pulpit Commentary agrees that "the day may have been a festival sabbath".

Verse 4
New King James Version
I must work the works of Him who sent Me while it is day; the night is coming when no one can work.
This verse begins with "we must" (hemas dei) in the Westcott-Hort version  and in the New International Version. The Textus Receptus and the Vulgate both use the singular, "I must". The reference to "Him who sent me" anticipates the evangelist's note that "Siloam means 'Sent' (verse 6), meaning that Jesus, who has been sent by his Father, "is also present in this water".

Verse 14
Now it was a Sabbath when Jesus made the clay and opened his eyes.
The circumstances are similar to the healing at Bethesda in John 5.

Verse 22
The Jews had agreed already that if anyone confessed that He (Jesus) was Christ, he would be put out of the synagogue.
The decision has been linked to the possible Council of Jamnia which was once thought to have decided the content of the Jewish canon sometime in the late 1st century (c. 70–90 AD).

Verse 34 confirms that "they cast him out", the Amplified Bible and the New Living Translation adding text to refer to his exclusion from the synagogue.

Verse 38
Then he said, "Lord, I believe!" And he worshiped Him.
A few manuscripts, such as Papyrus 75 and Codex Sinaiticus, omit the whole of verse 38 and the beginning of verse 39.

Verse 39 
And Jesus said, "For judgment I have come into this world, that those who do not see may see, and that those who see may be made blind."

Verses 40-41 
"Surely, we are not blind, are we?" Jesus said to them, "If you were blind, you would not have sin. But now that you say, 'We see', your sin remains."

See also
 Healing the man blind from birth
 Jesus Christ
 Pool of Siloam
 Other related Bible parts: 2 Kings 20, 2 Chronicles 32, Isaiah 8

References

External links
 King James Bible - Wikisource
English Translation with Parallel Latin Vulgate
Online Bible at GospelHall.org (ESV, KJV, Darby, American Standard Version, Bible in Basic English)
Multiple bible versions at Bible Gateway (NKJV, NIV, NRSV etc.)

John 09